Martin Hare (born 28 November 1989) is a British handball player. He was born in Brighton, East Sussex, England. At the 2012 Summer Olympics he competed with the Great Britain men's national handball team in the men's tournament.

Career
In 2012, Hare played top flight handball in Norway with Viking HK. In 2017, he was playing for Sandnes.

References

Living people
1989 births
Sportspeople from Brighton
Handball players at the 2012 Summer Olympics
Olympic handball players of Great Britain
British male handball players